The 2017 Luxembourg communal elections were held on 8 October to elect the communal councils of the 102 municipalities of Luxembourg.

Electoral system
Luxembourg citizens aged over 18 and living in the country were able to vote. Citizens from any EU country could vote if they were registered on the electoral list, the requirements for which were to have lived in Luxembourg for at least 5 years and to be living in Luxembourg during the election. Citizens from any other country could vote subject to the same requirements as for EU citizens, plus the requirement of holding valid visa or residence permit.

The number of seats in each communal council was determined by the population of the commune. The population-seat ratio on each communal council was established on the following scale:

Plurality-at-large voting was used in municipalities with a population of under 2,999 inhabitants. In municipalities with a population of over 3,000 inhabitants, proportional representation with open lists was used. Voters could vote for a party list or cast multiple votes for as many candidates as there are seats. Seat allocation was calculated in accordance with the Hagenbach-Bischoff quota. On 1 January 2018, 6 municipalities will be merged and 3 new municipalities will be created as a result. The councillors will be elected in different constituencies, which correspond to the old boundaries.

Candidates
There were a total of 3,575 candidates. The total number of councillors elected with proportional representation was 600, corresponding to 45 municipalities plus the section of Hobscheid (future municipality of Habscht).

The different political parties ran in the following number of municipalities:
CSV: 46
DP: 43
LSAP: 41
Greens: 34
ADR: 9
The Left: 9
Pirate Party: 5
KPL: 5
Others: 9

Results

Municipalities using proportional representation

Municipalities using majoritarian system

Detailed results

References

External links
 Elections in Luxembourg

2017 elections in Europe
2017